Highline Lake State Park is a Colorado state park. It is home to two lakes, Highline Lake, elevation  and  Mack Mesa Lake, elevation . It is well known for its birdwatching opportunities and has two wildlife migratory waterfowl overlook kiosks where it is possible to watch great blue heron, white pelicans, and whooping crane, among many others. There is fishing allowed all year round. It is also open in winter to snowshoers and cross country skiers.

Zebra mussel infestation
Colorado Parks and Wildlife (CPW) first detected zebra mussels in Highline Lake in September 2022. Further testing the following month found an established population of the mussels in the lake, leading CPW to classify the lake as infested. This zebra mussel infestation is the first in Colorado.

References 

State parks of Colorado
Protected areas of Mesa County, Colorado
Protected areas established in 1967
1967 establishments in Colorado